Nyssa Raatko, also known as Nyssa al Ghul, is a supervillainess in DC Comics. Nyssa Raatko was created by Greg Rucka and Klaus Janson for the Batman series of comic books. She is an enemy of Batman.  She is the daughter of Ra's al Ghul and the half-sister of Talia al Ghul.

Nyssa made her first live-action appearance as a recurring character on the Arrowverse television series Arrow starting in the second season, played by Katrina Law. She also appeared in the final season of Gotham, portrayed by Jaime Murray.

Fictional character biography
In Batman: Death and the Maidens, it is revealed that Ra's al Ghul and a Jewish peasant woman had a love child born during his travels in Russia in the 18th century named Nyssa. Enamored by the romantic stories that her mother told her about Ra's as a child, Nyssa sets out to find Ra's and eventually locates him at his headquarters in North Africa.

Impressed by her beauty, warrior skills, and her determination and ability to locate him, he promotes her as his right hand associate and they go on adventures together. Ra's is so impressed with her abilities, he even allows Nyssa to use his Lazarus Pits. Like her sister Talia, Nyssa eventually becomes disenchanted with Ra's genocidal plans to "cleanse the Earth", and disassociates herself from her father sometime in the early 20th century. Ra's reluctantly approves this, believing that she will return to him and that she or her children will become his future heirs. To his disappointment, Nyssa refuses to give herself or her family to him, causing him to disown her permanently. He does however allow her to keep a Lazarus Pit for herself which helps her survive until the modern times.

The Second World War
During World War II, Nyssa and her family are quickly sent to a concentration camp, where Nyssa's entire family dies and she is rendered infertile by very Mengele-style experiments. At one point she begs Ra's for help, but he refuses her.

Death and the Maidens
Broken by her horrifying experiences during this time, and enraged that Ra's has abandoned her and her family to die at the hands of the Nazis, Nyssa is finally motivated to act when her great-grandsonher last living descendant - is killed. She plots to kill Ra's by befriending, kidnapping, and brainwashing Talia and using her to kill Ra's. To this end, she captures Talia and, using a Lazarus Pit, kills and resurrects her in rapid succession. Rendered apathetic by her time in the camp, unable to feel anything, Nyssa then attempts to destroy all hope and optimism in the world by assassinating Superman with Kryptonite bullets she steals from the Batcave, hoping that, by uniting the world in one moment of tragedy, she will manage to rouse herself once more.

While Batman is successful in preventing the assassination of Superman, he is unable to stop Ra's from being killed by Nyssa. This in turn is part of a greater plan by Ra's to ensure that his daughters, both initially dissatisfied with his plans, will realize that he is right, and that they would come to accept their destinies as his heirs. Realizing and accepting this, both Nyssa and Talia become the heads of the League of Assassins.

Lazarus Pit
The Lazarus pit can grant restorative properties that can heal injuries and even grant immortality. Nyssa is in possession of one of the world's last Lazarus Pits, which has granted her longevity and the ability to heal her wounds; she survives The Holocaust thanks to its powers. She also found the ability to use the pit multiple times. She is also extremely wealthy, especially since she assumes control of Ra's' organization and joins forces with Talia. Like her father and  half-sister, she knows Batman's secret identity and the location of the Batcave.

"Infinite Crisis"
During "Infinite Crisis", Nyssa and her sister connive to use Talia's membership in Luthor's Secret Society of Super Villains in order to take over the planet. Nyssa tries to recruit Batgirl (as Cassandra Cain) to stand at her side as "The One Who Is All". She attempts to explain why she is working with the villains of the Society to Batgirl:

Cassandra refuses, and, along with Mr. Freeze, escapes from Nyssa's grasp.

In "One Year Later", Nyssa is seen in Northern Africa, planning an unknown plot with two terrorists. As she gets into her car to leave, it explodes. In the following issue, Lady Shiva reports that Nyssa Raatko is dead where she was probably killed by the League of Assassins.

In other media

Television

 Nyssa al Ghul appears as a recurring character in the CW series Arrow, portrayed by Katrina Law. First appearing in season two, Nyssa al Ghul teams up with protagonists to take down Deathstroke. She reappears in season three, following Sara's murder, Nyssa trains Laurel Lance. In the season finale of season 3, Nyssa works with Oliver and his allies to defeat and kill Ra's. She then reappears in season four to oppose Laurel's reckless scheme to resurrect Sara using the Lazarus Pit. She declines the leadership of the League and instead disbands it. In season five, Oliver recruits Nyssa to join his team to oppose Adrian Chase and his team, which includes Nyssa's sister Talia. In season six, Nyssa battles the Thanatos Guild. Nyssa is later seen in a flashforward in season seven, training Mia Smoak, Oliver and Felicity's secret daughter, throughout her childhood. In the series finale episode "Fadeout" Nyssa has reconciles with Talia at Oliver's funeral.
 Law reprises her role in the spin-off series Legends of Tomorrow. The episode "Left Behind" reveals that Nyssa's first meeting with Sara is the result of a Bootstrap paradox. She makes an appearance in "River in Time", where Sara says goodbye to her before she leaves on the Waverider.
 Nyssa al-Ghul appears in one of the tie-in comic books of the Crisis on Infinite Earths crossover event, along with Felicity Smoak, The Ray, and Wally West.

Nyssa al Ghul appears in the fifth season of the FOX television series Gotham, as portrayed by Jaime Murray. She acts as one of the season's main antagonists alongside Bane. She is originally introduced as the "Secretary of Homeland Security" named Theresa Walker. Throughout the season she works via multiple proxies and henchmen such as Bane, Riddler, Leslie Thompkins, and Hugo Strange. After Jim Gordon and Bruce Wayne realize someone is manipulating these events, they are able to convince Riddler to turn over evidence on his boss. As a result, "Theresa Walker" is ousted from the government and forced to go on the run. After arriving in Gotham, she reveals to Bruce that she is in fact Nyssa al Ghul, daughter of the recently-deceased Ra's al Ghul, seeking vengeance for her father's death. Nyssa is ultimately defeated in combat with the combined efforts of Gordon and Barbara Kean. She is able to escape arrest and steal Oswald Cobblepot's submarine, forcing Bruce to leave the city in pursuit of her.

Film
Nyssa is seen in Batman vs. Teenage Mutant Ninja Turtles in an online file when the Ninja Turtles were seeking information of Ra's al Ghul and his obtaining longevity via Lazarus Pits.

Video games
 Nyssa Raatko is referenced in Batman: Arkham Origins. She is mentioned on Lady Shiva's assassin profile as an associate of Lady Shiva alongside David Cain and Richard Dragon.
 Nyssa Raatko appears in Batman: Arkham Knight, voiced by Jennifer Hale. Like the comics, Nyssa is depicted as Ra's al Ghul's daughter. She appears in the "Season of Infamy" DLC in the "Shadow War" story. Nyssa is leading a rebellious faction of the League of Assassins. When Batman arrives at a previously-unknown secondary Lazarus pit (separate from the one located in Wonder City) and prepares to blow it up after taking a sample, Nyssa confronts him along with a few of her separatist forces. She takes the detonator and reasons with Batman that each time Ra's al Ghul is resurrected, he becomes less and less of a man, and gives him an ultimatum: deny him the remnants of the Lazarus and she will recall all her forces from Gotham taking the war elsewhere. After detonating the explosive gel that Batman sprayed all over the pit, Nyssa leaves Batman to his own devices. When Batman returns to Elliot Memorial Hospital where a decrepit Ra's al Ghul is hooked up to a constant supply of Lazarus, Batman can go with one of two choices both of them involving Nyssa:
 Batman can give the Lazarus to Ra's al Ghul at which point Batman is forced to fight Nyssa and her separatists. Not soon after, Ra's al Ghul regains his former strength and remarks that Nyssa is a traitor where he slashes her torso. Batman tries to fight him, but Ra's al Ghul steals one of his smoke bombs and disappears. Batman offers to save Nyssa with the remaining Lazarus, but she refuses. Batman comforts Nyssa in her dying moments and closes her eyes before he leaves.
 Batman can deny Ra's al Ghul and after he takes care of Ra's al Ghul's loyalists, Nyssa arrives to see what her father has ultimately become. As she is about to strike him down, Batman stops her and says that he will take him to the GCPD. Nyssa is satisfied and lives up to her word, recalling all her forces from Gotham while Batman takes Ra's al Ghul to a special cell and straps him to a gurney.

References

Batman characters
Characters created by Greg Rucka
Comics characters introduced in 2003
DC Comics female superheroes
DC Comics female supervillains
DC Comics LGBT superheroes
DC Comics LGBT supervillains
DC Comics martial artists
Fictional American Jews in comics
Fictional Arabs
Fictional alchemists
Fictional characters with slowed ageing
Fictional cult leaders
Fictional female assassins
Fictional Jewish women
Fictional Holocaust survivors
Fictional bisexual females
Fictional mass murderers
Fictional LGBT characters in television
Jewish superheroes